Chengdu Public Transport Group Co., Ltd is a publicly listed majority state-owned public transport company based in the city of Chengdu, China. Founded in July 1952, it was formerly known as Chengdu Bus Company before merging with the Chengdu Tramway Company to become the Chengdu Public Transport Company on 1st May 1983. It was renamed to Chengdu Public Transport Group Corporation on 28th September 1999.

As of the end of December 2012, Chengdu Public Transport Group owned 10,521 buses 2,850 taxis. It operates 294 bus operation lines, 75 bus stations in use (including maintenance yards), and covers an area of 1,650 mu. The average daily passenger capacity of buses is 4.75 million. In 2013, the company's buses traveled 117 million kilometers, a year-on-year increase of 12.31%, and the total passenger traffic was 529 million, a year-on-year increase of 11.80%. Public transportation comprises a 26.1% share of the city's transport.

Operations
Chengdu Public Transport Group provides a wide variety of services including buses, taxis, public bicycles, car repairs, car rentals, bus advertising, property management, and driver training.

Subsidiaries
Chengdu Public Transport Group's subsidiaries responsible for bus operations:
Star Bus Co., Ltd.
Win Hing Bus Co., Ltd.
North Star Bus Co., Ltd.
East Star Bus Co., Ltd.
New City Bus Co., Ltd.
Longquan Bus Co., Ltd.
Pidu District Bus Co., Ltd.
Xindu Bus Co., Ltd.
Qingbaijiang Bus Co., Ltd.
Wenjiang Guanghua Bus Co., Ltd.
Shuangliu Bus Co., Ltd.
Tianfu New District Public Transport Co., Ltd.

Subsidiaries responsible for other businesses:
Chengdu Public Transport Employment Agency
Chengdu Public Transport Skyworth Cultural Advertising Co., Ltd.
Chengdu Zhongbei Travel Agency Co., Ltd.
Sichuan Zhongyou Public Transport Energy Co., Ltd.
Rongcheng Taxi Co., Ltd.

See also
 Chengdu BRT
 Chengdu Metro

References

External links
 Official Website

Transport in Chengdu
Bus operating companies of China
Chinese companies established in 1952
Transport companies established in 1952